Coriolano Garzadori (or Garzadoro) was a Roman Catholic prelate who served as Bishop of Ossero (1575–1614).

Biography
On 19 January 1575, he was appointed during the papacy of Pope Gregory XIII as Bishop of Ossero. He served as Bishop of Ossero until his resignation in 1614. While bishop, he was the principal consecrator of Lothar von Metternich, Archbishop of Trier (1600) and Johann Nopel der Jüngere, Auxiliary Bishop of Cologne (1602); and the principal co-consecrator of Ludovico Sarego, Bishop of Adria (1612); Bartolomeo Cartolario, Bishop of Chioggia (1613); Andreas Corbelli, Bishop of Canea (1613); and Ottaviano Garzadori, Bishop of Ossero (1614).

References 

16th-century Roman Catholic bishops in Croatia
17th-century Roman Catholic bishops in Croatia
Bishops appointed by Pope Gregory XIII